Shashikant Akkappa Naik is an Indian politician from the Bharatiya Janata Party, Karnataka who served as the Minister of Horticulture from 21 June 2006 to 8 October 2007 under H. D. Kumaraswamy.

Political career 
Shashikanth Naik entered electoral politics by contesting 1994 Karnataka Assembly election from Hukkeri on a KRRS ticket. He lost to Umesh Katti of Janata Dal by a margin of 23,063 votes. He however defeated Umesh Katti in 2004 Karnataka Assembly election on a BJP ticket by a margin of 821 votes. He was inducted into H. D. Kumaraswamy ministry on 21 June 2006 and was allotted Horticulture Department. He however lost in 2008 to Umesh Katti of JDS, who then defected to BJP under Operation Kamala carried out by Yediyurappa. Shashikant Naik was later fielded as the BJP candidate for by-poll to Legislative Council from Belgaum local authority constituency which had fallen vacant after the sitting legislator Satish Jarkiholi was elected to Karnataka Legislative Assembly from Yemkanmardi.

References 

1960 births
Members of the Karnataka Legislative Council
Living people
Bharatiya Janata Party politicians from Karnataka